{{DISPLAYTITLE:C3H2O3}}
The molecular formula C3H2O3 may refer to:

 Deltic acid, chemical substance; a ketone and double alcohol of cyclopropene
 Malonic anhydride, an organic compound; the anhydride of malonic acid, or a double ketone of oxetane
 Vinylene carbonate, simplest unsaturated cyclic carbonic acid ester